Ronald Dennis Grant Martin (August 22, 1907 in Calgary, Alberta — February 7, 1971) was a Canadian professional ice hockey player who played 94 games in the National Hockey League with the New York Americans between 1932 and 1934. The rest of his career, which lasted from 1926 to 1944, was spent in various minor leagues.

He was a younger brother of Calgary Tigers player Foley Martin.

Career statistics

Regular season and playoffs

References

External links
 

1907 births
1971 deaths
Buffalo Bisons (IHL) players
Calgary Tigers players
Canadian ice hockey right wingers
Edmonton Eskimos (ice hockey) players
Kitchener Millionaires players
New York Americans players
Niagara Falls Cataracts players
Portland Buckaroos players
Ice hockey people from Calgary
Syracuse Stars (IHL) players
Toronto Millionaires players
Vancouver Lions players